YBY or yby may refer to:

 YBY, the IATA code for Bonnyville Airport, Alberta, Canada
 yby, the ISO 639-3 code for Yaweyuha language, Papua New Guinea